Wild Card is a 2003 South Korean film directed by Kim Yoo-jin. The crime drama has received mixed reviews.

Premise
Veteran detective Oh Young-dal and his younger, loose-cannon partner Bang Jae-su are investigating the serial's rape-murders of young women in Seoul. They begin to close in on gang leader Kim Min-ki, a psychopath who carries a metal ball and chain.

Cast
Jung Jin-young as Oh Young-dal  
Yang Dong-geun as Bang Je-su
Han Chae-young as Kang Na-na
Gi Ju-bong as Squad leader Kim
Kim Myeong-gook as Jang Chil-sun
Hwang Jun-yeong as Go Myeong-hwan
Yu Ha-bok as Hwang Cheol-gu
Bang Guk-hyeon as Shim Young-man
Lee Dong-kyu as Noh Jae-bong
Seo Jae-kyeong as Kim Min-ki
Kim Gi-se as Wang Su-chang
Kim Chang-gyu as Go Du-man
Lee Do-kyeong as Do Sang-chun
Jo Kyung-hoon as Gomtaeng-i
Chae Min-seok as Gal-chi
Shin Jung-geun as Neob-chi ("Halibut")
Lee Dol-hyung as Sun-dae ("Blood sausage")
Yang Han-seok as Kang Il-man
Shin Kyeong-ah as Kang Suk
Lee Jeong-in as Shin Suk-jeong
Baek Shin as Detective Kim
Han Seong-sik as Delivery guy of Chinese restaurant
Cha Soon-bae

Reception 
Wild Card has received mixed reviews.

Derek Elley, writing for Variety, states that although there is "nothing new" about the premise or plot, the film has "well-written and well-played characters whose ensemble chemistry pays off in the final reels." Andrew Robertson, from "Eye For Film," called the film "exciting" with an "almost Seventies feel."

References

External links
 

2003 films
South Korean crime thriller films
Police detective films
Films directed by Kim Yoo-jin
South Korean crime action films
2000s South Korean films